The Battle of the Lys may refer to:

 Battle of the Lys (1918), part of the German Spring Offensive
 Battle of the Lys and the Escaut (1918), part of the Allied Hundred Days Offensive
 Battle of the Lys (1940), a battle during the Second World War near the Belgian city of Kortrijk